The cinnamon dog-faced bat (Cynomops abrasus), is a South American bat species of the family Molossidae. It is found in  northern and central South America.

Taxonomy 
The bat belongs to the genus Cynomops, which was recently split from the genus Molossops.

There are four recognised subspecies:

 Cynomops abrasus abrasus (Temminck, 1827)
 C. a. brachymeles (Peters, 1866)
 C. a. cerastes (Thomas, 1901)
 C. a. mastivus (Thomas, 1911)

Description 
The dorsal fur is brown, dark brown or chestnut. The ventral fur is similar in color to the dorsal fur. A dense patch of fur is present on the wing, located on the top back third of the forearm and propatagial membrane. There is also a second patch of fur on the bottom, back three-quarters of the forearm that extends across the patagium near the wrist to the base of the fourth metacarpal. These patches are darker in color than the membrane. 

The bats have a broad face with widely separated ears. There are no wrinkles on the lips. There is also no nose leaf present. The bats display sexual dimorphism.

Biology 
The bat is insectivorous. They typically feed on hard-shelled insects.

Habitat and distribution 
The species is found on the eastern side of the Andes in northern Argentina, Bolivia, Brazil, Colombia, Ecuador, French Guiana, Guyana, Peru, Paraguay, Suriname and Venezuela. The bat is an open-air hunter and is limited to forests. It is found in high and dense forests in Argentina and near floodable lands in Paraguay.

The bat roosts in colonies of up to 75 individuals. The bat roosts in decayed logs and hollow trees, and tends to pick relatively warm area to roost.

Conservation 
The bat is listed as data-deficient by the IUCN because of a paucity of records of the bat and the lack of knowledge about its habitat and status. The species could be threatened by deforestation occurring in its range.

References

Cynomops
Mammals described in 1827
Bats of South America
Mammals of Colombia
Taxa named by Coenraad Jacob Temminck